A GMO is a genetically modified organism.

GMO may also refer to:
 Genetically modified food
 Gell-Mann–Okubo mass formula in particle physics
 Generalised molecular orbital theory, in chemistry
 Gulf, Mobile and Ohio Railroad, a U.S. railroad carrier corporation
 U.S. Bank Championship in Milwaukee (formerly Greater Milwaukee Open), a golfing competition
 Grantham, Mayo, Van Otterloo & Co. LLC ("GMO"), a Boston-based asset management firm led by Jeremy Grantham
 GMO Internet, Inc, a Japanese internet services company, and parent of web security company GlobalSign

Music
 The Glenn Miller Orchestra, a U.S. jazz group
 Green Mountain Orchestra, a band from Hong Kong